The Government College University Hyderabad (GCUH) is a public university located in Hyderabad, Sindh, Pakistan.

History
It was founded in 1917 by Annie Besant as Government College Kali Mori . On its 100th anniversary in 2017, Government of Sindh announced to upgrade it into a full-fledged university.

See also
 List of universities in Pakistan

References

External links
 

Public universities and colleges in Sindh
Universities and colleges in Hyderabad, Sindh
Educational institutions established in 1917
1917 establishments in British India